Jasper Steverlinck (born 30 April 1976) is a Belgian Flemish singer and guitarist for Ghent-based Arid.
 
Steverlinck and his band Arid were finalists at Humo's Rock Rally in 1996. In 2000, Arid released their debut album Little Things of Venom and the follow-up All Is Quiet Now in 2002. Arid also performed several years at Rock Werchter.

In 2002 Steverlinck also started a solo career. His first single, "Life on Mars" in 2003 was a huge success. The single stayed at the top of the Ultratop 50 Official singles chart in Belgium for 8 weeks. His solo album Songs of Innocence also peaked at number one for 5 weeks. In 2005, he became ill with toxoplasmosis and could not work for a long while. He returned to music in 2008 with Arid's third album All Things Come in Waves. In 2012, Steverlinck focussed again on his solo career working with his brother.

In parallel, he became the singer of the newly-created project progressive metal band Guilt Machine, by Dutch musician Arjen Anthony Lucassen (creator of Ayreon among others), in 2009. He was featured in their only album, On This Perfect Day, released in 2009.

He also appeared as a guest singer on "Firelight", a song by the Dutch symphonic metal band Within Temptation from their seventh studio album Resist.

In popular culture
In 2001 Steverlinck went to work as a voice actor when he took on the role of Johnny in the movie Haunted Castle.

In 2011–2012, he became one of four coaches in the talent show The Voice van Vlaanderen. Glenn Claes part of his Team Jasper Steverlinck won the inaugural season 1 of the talent show. In 2013, another of his team contestants Paulien Mathues won again on season 2 of the show.

Discography

Albums
Songs of Innocence (2004)
Uncut (2017), EP
Night Prayer (2018)

Singles

References

External links
Official website

1976 births
Living people
English-language singers from Belgium
21st-century Belgian male singers
21st-century Belgian singers